The 2009–10 Bowling Green Falcons men's basketball team represented Bowling Green State University in the college basketball season of 2009–10.  The team was coached by Louis Orr and played their homes game in Anderson Arena.

Coaching staff

Preseason

Roster changes
Only two starters return from last year's team.  Both senior Otis Polk and junior Joe Jakubowski started all 33 games from Bowling Green's previous season.  Along with these two players, the Falcons also return sophomores Dee Brown and Scott Thomas as well as senior Erik Marschall, all who started at least 30 games in the season.  Bowling Green also added seven new players to their roster.  Out of those players, one (Darion Goins) is a transfer from San José State.

Recruiting

Roster

Schedule

|- style="background:#f9f9f9;"
| colspan=9 | *Non-Conference Game.  #Rankings from AP Poll.  All times are in Eastern Time Zone.
|}

References

Bowling Green Falcons men's basketball seasons
Bowling Green